is a city located in Ishikawa Prefecture, Japan. , the city had an estimated population of 35,188 in 12787 households, and a population density of 550 persons per km².

Geography
Kahoku is located in central Ishikawa Prefecture. It is approximately 20 km north of the capital of, Kanazawa, or thirty minutes by train. Kahoku lies between the Sea of Japan to the west, the town of Hōdatsushimizu to the north, the town of Tsubata to the east and the town of Uchinada to the south.  Geographically from the east to west, Kahoku is composed of a mountainous region, a hilly region, a terrace region, a lowland region and then a coastal region. In the northern part of town the Ōmi River flows into the Sea of Japan and in the southern area, the Unoke River flows into the Kahoku Lagoon which marks the southernmost part of Kahoku.

Neighbouring municipalities 
Ishikawa Prefecture
Tsubata
Uchinada
Hōdatsushimizu

Climate
Kahoku has a humid continental climate (Köppen Cfa) characterized by mild summers and cold winters with heavy snowfall.  The average annual temperature in Kahoku is 14.1 °C. The average annual rainfall is 2500 mm with September as the wettest month. The temperatures are highest on average in August, at around 26.6 °C, and lowest in January, at around 2.9 °C.

Demographics
Per Japanese census data, the population of Kahoku has remained steady over the past 40 years.

History 
The area around Kahoku was mostly part of ancient Kaga Province, with  a small portion of its northern area in Noto Province. The area became part Kaga Domain under the Edo period Tokugawa shogunate. Following the Meiji restoration, the area was organised into Kahoku District, Ishikawa. The villages of Takamatsu, Nanatsuka and Unoke were established with the creation of the modern municipalities system on April 1, 1889. Takamatsu was raised to town status on August 1, 1922, Nanatsuka on February 11, 1940 and  Unoke on February 11, 1948. The three towns merged on March 1, 2004 to form the city of Kahoku.

Government
Kahoku has a mayor-council form of government with a directly elected mayor and a unicameral city legislature of 18 members.

Economy 
The local economy of Kahoku is dominated by agriculture.

Education
Kahoku has six public elementary schools and three middle schools operated by the city government; however, the city does not have a high school. The Ishikawa Prefectural Nursing University  is also located in Kahoku.

Junior high schools
Unoke Junior High School
Kahokudai Junior High School
Takamatsu Junior High School

Elementary schools
Unoke Elementary School
Kanazu Elementary School
Takamatsu Elementary School
Ōmi Elementary school
Nanatsuka Elementary school
Sotohisumi Elementary school

Transportation

Railway
  West Japan Railway Company - Nanao Line
 -  -

Highway

Twin towns – sister cities

Kahoku is twinned with:
 Meßkirch, Germany (1985)

Local attractions
Kamiyamada Shell Mound, a National Historic Site

Notable people from Kahoku
 Kitaro Nishida, philosopher

References

External links

 Kahoku City official website 
 Kahoku City official website

 
Cities in Ishikawa Prefecture
Populated coastal places in Japan